Devante Parker (born 16 March 1996) is a German former professional footballer who played as a winger. He represented Germany internationally at various youth levels up to U19.

Club career
Parker began his career in the academy of 1. FSV Mainz 05. He made his Bundesliga debut on 31 August 2014 against Hannover 96 replacing Koo Ja-cheol after 82 minutes in a 0–0 draw. He spent the 2016–17 season playing for the club's reserves scoring 1 goal in 20 appearances.

In July 2017, Parker joined Austrian Football Bundesliga side SKN St. Pölten on loan for the 2017–18 season. His loan was cut short by a cruciate ligament tear.

In July 2020 Parker announced his retirement from playing. He was unable to regain professional fitness after a second cruciate ligament tear.

Career statistics

Personal life
He is the younger brother of Shawn Parker, who also is a professional footballer.

References

External links
 
 

1996 births
Living people
German people of American descent
Sportspeople from Wiesbaden
Association football midfielders
German footballers
Germany youth international footballers
1. FSV Mainz 05 players
1. FSV Mainz 05 II players
SKN St. Pölten players
Bundesliga players
3. Liga players
Footballers from Hesse